

Active parties by country

Defunct parties by country

Organizations associated with Libertarian parties

See also

 Liberal parties by country
 List of libertarian organizations
 Lists of political parties
 Outline of libertarianism

References

Libertarian